Craig Alan Wolfley (born May 19, 1958) is a former football player and current color analyst for the Pittsburgh Steelers.  Along with former teammate Max Starks, he hosts a show on 970 ESPN.

College career
Wolfley attended Syracuse University from 1976 to 1979.  He was a four-year letter winner as an offensive lineman.  In 1999, Wolfley was named to the Syracuse University Football All Century team.

Professional career
A fifth round NFL draft pick, he played offensive guard and offensive tackle for the Pittsburgh Steelers from 1980 to 1989.  He ended his career with the Minnesota Vikings from 1990 to 1991.  Wolfley started 104 games, the majority at left guard.

Other sports
In addition to football, Wolfley competed in weight lifting, boxing, sumo wrestling and martial arts.  In 1981, he placed fifth in the World's Strongest Man competition.  In 2002, Wolfley lost a four-round boxing match to Butterbean.  He also holds a black belt in jiu jitsu.

Personal life
Wolfley attended South Hills Bible Chapel under the pastoral leadership of Dr. John H. Munro with two other notable Steelers, Mike Webster and Tunch Ilkin.

Wolfley and his wife Faith have three daughters, Megan, Hannah, and Esther, and three sons, Kyle, 'CJ', and 'Max'. Wolfley also has 4 children from a previous marriage. He and Faith are the former owners of the Wolfpack Boxing Club in Carnegie, PA (previously known as MASC & located in Bridgeville PA), where they taught boxing, martial arts and other athletics.

He is the brother of Ron Wolfley, former running back of the Arizona Cardinals. Like his older brother, Ron is the color analyst for his former team and is also the co-host of a daily sports radio talk show “Wolf and Luke” on 98.7 FM in Phoenix.

References

External links

 

Players of American football from Buffalo, New York

National Football League announcers
1958 births
Living people
American football offensive linemen
Minnesota Vikings players
Pittsburgh Steelers players
Syracuse Orange football players
Radio personalities from Pittsburgh